"Only God (Could Stop Me Loving You)" is a song written by Robert John "Mutt" Lange and recorded by Billy Ray Cyrus for his 1994 album Storm in the Heartland, but not released as a single. The song was also recorded by Chris Ward for 1996 album One Step Beyond and by Lari White as a duet with Toby Keith for White's 1998 album Stepping Stone.

In 2002, the song was recorded by Emerson Drive for their self-titled major-label debut album. Their version was released as a single in March 2003 and peaked at number 23 on the Billboard Hot Country Songs chart.

Music video
The music video was directed by Steven Goldmann and premiered in mid-2003.

Chart positions
Emerson Drive's version peaked at number 23 on Hot Country Songs, spending twenty-four weeks on that chart.

References

1994 songs
2003 singles
Emerson Drive songs
Billy Ray Cyrus songs
Lari White songs
Toby Keith songs
Male–female vocal duets
Songs written by Robert John "Mutt" Lange
Song recordings produced by James Stroud
Music videos directed by Steven Goldmann
DreamWorks Records singles
Song recordings produced by Julian King (recording engineer)